Celso Fredy Güity Núñez (13 July 1958 – 12 February 2021) was a Honduran footballer who played as a forward  for Honduras in the 1982 FIFA World Cup.

Club career
Güity played six years for Marathón and also had a season at Sula.

Personal life
Güity worked in construction in New York after his football career. He died of bone cancer in Miami in February 2021.

References

External links

1958 births
2021 deaths
1982 FIFA World Cup players
Association football forwards
C.D. Marathón players
Honduran footballers
Honduras international footballers
Place of birth missing
Deaths from cancer in Florida
Honduran emigrants to the United States